Gerald Taggart (born 18 October 1970) is a Northern Irish former professional footballer. He played for Barnsley, Bolton Wanderers, Leicester City, Manchester City and Stoke City as well as the Northern Ireland national team.

A former defender, Taggart began his career as a trainee with Manchester City in 1989 but joined Barnsley in 1990 after being unable to break into the first team at Maine Road. He soon became a popular player with the "Tykes" supporters due to his passionate and committed performances. After spending five years with Barnsley making 249 appearances he joined Bolton Wanderers where he helped them to win the Division One title in 1996–97. He signed for Leicester City in 1998 and played in back to back League Cup Finals with Leicester winning the cup in 2000. He remained with Leicester until 2003 when he joined Stoke City. He spent three seasons at the Britannia Stadium and after a short spell with Tamworth he retired from playing.

After his retirement in 2007, he began his coaching/managing career for Leicester. On 10 June 2010, he was announced as the new assistant manager at Oldham Athletic. He was placed on garden leave by the club on 31 December 2012 following a run of poor results.

Club career

Manchester City
Taggart started his career as a trainee with Manchester City in 1989. Taggart spent one season with the club making 13 appearances, and scoring one goal.

Barnsley
Limited chances in the Manchester City team saw Taggart drop down a division to take up the option of joining Barnsley where he spent five seasons, making the Northern Irish national team in the process. Taggart spent most of his time at Barnsley under former Northern Ireland player Danny Wilson, where he made 247 appearances and scored 20 goals for the club.

Bolton Wanderers
Taggart signed for Bolton Wanderers for a club record £1.5 million on 1 August 1995, as they prepared for the Premier League after winning promotion from Division One. However, he was unable to prevent them from being relegated after just one season.

In his second season with the club, Taggart helped Bolton reach the Premier League after they had amassed 98 points and scored 100 goals in that season and gained promotion as Champions of the First Division. The following season Taggart was relegated back to the First Division. In a total of three seasons with the club, Taggart made 81 appearances, scoring five goals for Bolton, with one such goal coming in the last ever game at the clubs old Burnden Park ground against Charlton Athletic in April 1997.

Leicester City
Taggart again played in the Premier League when he signed for Leicester City on 16 June 1998. Taggart was often partnered with Steve Walsh and Matt Elliott in Leicester's defence. In 2000, he won a League Cup winners medal with Leicester.

He scored his last European goal in a 1–1 UEFA Cup draw against Red Star Belgrade on 15 September 2000, at Filbert Street. In the 2001–02 season Leicester were relegated from the Premier League and Taggart opted to remain with the "Foxes" and helped them regain their top-flight status. He was over looked for the first team squad in the Premier League and joined Stoke City on loan then on a permanent basis.

Stoke City
Taggart joined Stoke City on loan on 9 December 2003. He instantly impressed Stoke manager Tony Pulis with his leadership qualities. His loan deal was extended for another month on 6 January 2004. But he was recalled by Leicester.

He joined Stoke on a permanent basis on 26 February 2004 until the end of the 2003–04. He then signed an extension at Stoke turning down an approach from Derby County. He formed a decent defensive partnership with Michael Duberry in the 2004–05 season Pulis was sacked at the end of it though and was replaced by Johan Boskamp. Boskamp used Taggart as a coach during his one season spell and he was not offered a new contract at the end of the season.

Tamworth
Taggart had spent the 2006–07 season back with his former club Leicester City to take his coaching badges. He signed for Conference North division side Tamworth on 16 May 2007. He played twice for the "Lambs" leaving to become assistant manager at Leicester.

International career
Taggart played international football for Northern Ireland, making his debut in 1990 and spending 13 years at the back for Northern Ireland with his final appearance coming in 2003 while at Leicester. Taggart earned 51 caps for Northern Ireland, scoring seven goals. He retired from his Northern Ireland and international football career on 18 August 2003.

Taggart spent 21 months out of the team after he was dropped by Lawrie McMenemy in 1998. He was recalled by incoming manager Sammy McIlroy.

Coaching career
Taggart returned to Leicester on 13 September 2007 as first team coach under Gary Megson. He and Frank Burrows became caretaker managers following Megson's departure to Bolton Wanderers on 25 October 2007.

Taggart left Leicester on 10 June 2010, when it was announced he would become the new assistant manager at Oldham Athletic alongside former Leicester teammate Paul Dickov. He was placed on garden leave by the club on 31 December 2012 following a run of poor results.

After football 
In July 2014, Taggart was appointed as a match summariser for Leicester City matches on BBC Radio Leicester during the pre-season, replacing the popular Leicester striker, Alan Young. He also appeared on the station's weekly Leicester City Football Forum talk show. Taggart's media career was brief; less than three weeks later he resigned from the role in order to take up the role as chief scout at Doncaster Rovers, but resigned in October 2015, following the sacking of Paul Dickov.

Career statistics

Club

International

Scores and results list Northern Ireland's goal tally first, score column indicates score after each Taggart goal.

Honours
Manchester City
FA Youth Cup runner-up: 1988–89

Bolton Wanderers
Football League Division One: 1996–97

Leicester City
Football League Cup: 1999–2000
Football League Cup runner-up: 1998–99
Football League Division One runner-up: 2002–03

Individual
First Division PFA Team of the Year: 1996–97

References

External links
 
 

1970 births
Living people
Association football defenders
Association footballers from Belfast
Association footballers from Northern Ireland
Northern Ireland international footballers
Manchester City F.C. players
Barnsley F.C. players
Bolton Wanderers F.C. players
Leicester City F.C. players
Stoke City F.C. players
Tamworth F.C. players
Premier League players
English Football League managers
Leicester City F.C. managers
Leicester City F.C. non-playing staff
Oldham Athletic A.F.C. non-playing staff
Doncaster Rovers F.C. non-playing staff
English Football League players
Football managers from Northern Ireland
National League (English football) players